Michael William Lanham (born 2 August 1951) is a British former motorcycle speedway rider who had a long career with Ipswich Witches.

Lanham took up speedway in 1971 at the training school at Rye House, and was given a competitive ride the same year by Canterbury Crusaders. He won the BSSC Junior Trophy in his first season. In 1972 he was given rides by West Ham Hammers, Glasgow Tigers, Birmingham Brummies (for whom he rode in 24 matches at an average close to six points), and Ipswich Witches, the team for which he would go on to ride for eleven seasons until 1982. In 1973 he continued to split his racing between Birmingham and Ipswich and in 1974 doubled up for Peterborough Panthers. In 1983 he moved to Eastbourne Eagles and later Leicester Lions. A broken arm, leg and pelvis in a crash while racing towards the end of the season at Leicester Stadium put him in hospital for five weeks and led to his retirement from the sport.

Lanham rode in the Second Division 'Young England' team in 1973 and 1974. He reached the British Final in 1976, 1979, and 1980.

Lanham's son Leigh followed him into a career in speedway.

References

1951 births
Living people
Sportspeople from Ipswich
British speedway riders
English motorcycle racers
Ipswich Witches riders
Birmingham Brummies riders
Peterborough Panthers riders
Eastbourne Eagles riders
Leicester Lions riders